Lino Lang (born 23 May 2000) is a Swiss professional footballer who plays as a forward for Luzern II.

Club career
Lang made his professional debut with FC Luzern in a 1–0 Swiss Super League loss to BSC Young Boys on 26 July 2020.

On 15 June 2021, he joined Kriens on loan.

References

External links
 
 SFL Profile
 Kicker Profile

2000 births
Sportspeople from Lucerne
Living people
Swiss men's footballers
Association football forwards
FC Luzern players
SC Kriens players
Swiss 1. Liga (football) players
Swiss Super League players
Swiss Challenge League players
Swiss Promotion League players